Dozzo is a surname. Notable people with the surname include:

Alison Dozzo (born 1968), Canadian swimmer
Gianpaolo Dozzo (born 1954), Italian politician